Marriages is a 1998 Italian romantic comedy film directed by Cristina Comencini. For her performance Cecilia Dazzi won  the David di Donatello for best supporting actress.

Plot
Giulia is getting everything ready for the Christmas Eve party she always hosts for her family, helped by her unmarried sister Sandra. Her husband Paolo keeps out of the way, going for a game of tennis when he finishes work. It is Giulia who has to go to the railway station to collect her brother Sergio and his wife Lucia, whose relationship is on the brink. Instead of greeting them, on an impulse she jumps on a train that takes her to her birthplace of Trani. 

A tense party continues without Giulia, who has bumped into Fausto, an old flame, while Paolo left on his own is being comforted by Sandra. For the New Year, everybody else comes down to Trani, where Giulia's separated parents are having a secret tryst in a hotel closed for the winter. When Fausto and Giulia sneak into an empty bedroom there, they are spotted by her mother and Giulia's virtue is preserved. While Paolo reconciles with Giulia, Sandra and Fausto discover they have a lot in common. Amid all this pairing off, Sergio and Lucia resolve to turn over a new leaf.

Cast 
Diego Abatantuono as Paolo
Francesca Neri as Giulia
Stefania Sandrelli as Vera 
Claude Brasseur as Alessio 
Paolo Sassanelli as Fausto
Cecilia Dazzi as Sandra
Lunetta Savino as Lucia
Emilio Solfrizzi as Sergio
Claire Keim as Catherine
Gigio Alberti
Fabio De Luigi

References

External links

1998 films
Italian romantic comedy films
Films directed by Cristina Comencini
1998 romantic comedy films
1990s Italian films